Shirish Jagjivandas Panchal (born 7 March 1943) is a Gujarati critic, fiction writer, translator and editor. He won the 2009 Sahitya Akademi Award for Gujarati language for his criticism Vaat Aapanaa Vivechan-ni. He refused the award.

Biography 
Panchal was born on 7 March 1943 in Vadodara. He passed his secondary and higher secondary board exams in 1978 and 1981 respectively. He completed his B.A. with Gujarati from Maharaja Sayajirao University of Baroda. After completing his M.A. in the same subject from the same university in 1966, he researched Poetic Criticism under the guidance of Suresh Joshi in 1980. Panchal received a PhD for his dissertation Kavyavivechan Ni Samasyao. He was a professor at Bilimora's College from 1965 to 1967 and at Padra's College from 1967 to 1980. Since 1980 he has been a lecturer in the Gujarati Department of M.S. University, Vadodara. He taught Gujarati language and literature at M. S. University, Baroda.

Works 
His first One-act play was published in Vishvmangal magazine. His short stories Varsha, Vallari and Aaram was published in Navbharat in 1962.

He wrote a short essay on the novel (1984) under the Sahityaswarup Parichay series edited by Suman Shah. His Vaidehee Etle Ja Vaidehee is an experimental novel, which tell a love-story of Kirat and Vaidehee. He edited and published Maniti Anamaniti (1982), 21 selected short stories by Suresh Joshi, with discourse. Problems of Poetic Criticism (1985) is his dissertation.  Jara Motethi (1988) is his collection of essays. Ruprachanthi Vighatan (1986) is a critical treatise re-examining the concept of modernity. 

He edited Etad, a Gujarati quarterly.

Recognition
In 2009, He won the Sahitya Akademi Award for Gujarati language for his criticism Vaat Aapanaa Vivechan-ni but he refused the award.

See also
 List of Gujarati-language writers

References

External links
 
 Introduction on Gujarati Sahitya Parishad

1943 births
Living people
Recipients of the Sahitya Akademi Award in Gujarati
Indian literary critics
Indian editors
Academic staff of Maharaja Sayajirao University of Baroda
People from Vadodara
21st-century Indian translators
Writers from Gujarat
Gujarati-language writers
Maharaja Sayajirao University of Baroda alumni